Gazanfar Alakbar oghlu Khaligov (December 16, 1898 — March 1, 1981) was a Soviet and Azerbaijani painter, People's Painter of the Azerbaijan SSR.

Biography 
Gazanfar Khaligov was born in Baku. He graduated from Azerbaijan State Art College in 1928.

He worked as a cartoonist in "Molla Nasraddin" in 1929–1930, in "Kirpi" magazine in 1953-1958 and "Ganj Ishchi" newspaper. In 1934, he created "Ferdowsi's Funeral" for the exhibition dedicated to the 1000th anniversary of Ferdowsi. In 1940, he became the first artist to create a portrait of Nizami Ganjavi by creating "Portrait of Nizami" in connection with the 800th anniversary of poet. He gave the stage and costume design of the performances as "Leyli and Majnun", "Asli and Karam". He is the author of a number of posters, theatrical sketches, graphic series ("Oil").

G. Khaligov died on March 1, 1981, in Baku. A secondary school and a street were named in honor of Gazanfar Khaligov in Gobu village of Absheron District. "Khosrov and Shirin" (1940), "Iskendername" (1953) watercolors are kept in the National Art Museum of Azerbaijan, "Portrait of Nizami" in the Nizami Museum of Azerbaijani Literature, and 17 works in the fund of the Azerbaijan State Art Gallery.

Awards 
 Honored Art Worker of the Azerbaijan SSR — April 23, 1940
 People's Painter of the Azerbaijan SSR — October 12, 1973
 Order of the Badge of Honour — June 9, 1959
 Order of the Red Banner of Labour – 1978

References

Sources 
 

1898 births
1981 deaths
20th-century Azerbaijani painters
Artists from Baku
Recipients of the Order of the Red Banner of Labour
Azerbaijani painters
Soviet painters
Soviet printmakers
Burials at II Alley of Honor